Vlado Trichkov is a village in Svoge Municipality, Sofia Province, western Bulgaria.

References

Villages in Sofia Province